William Terry (1798 – ??) was an innkeeper and political figure in Upper Canada.

He was born at Newark (Niagara-on-the-Lake) in 1798, the son of Parshall Terry who was a member of the 1st Parliament of Upper Canada. He lived in Thorold Township, where he operated an inn. He served in the local militia during the War of 1812. He represented the 1st and 2nd ridings of Lincoln in the 10th Parliament of Upper Canada. Terry's name last appears in 1830 and likely left Canada to Utah where many of the Terry family had left.

References

Further reading 
Becoming Prominent: Leadership in Upper Canada, 1791-1841, J.K. Johnson (1989)

1798 births
Members of the Legislative Assembly of Upper Canada
People from Niagara-on-the-Lake
People from Thorold
Year of death missing